Clarence Eugene Hancock (February 13, 1885 – January 3, 1948) was an American attorney and politician from New York. He was most notable for his service as a U.S. Representative from 1927 to 1947.

A native of Syracuse, New York, Hancock graduated from Wesleyan University (1906) and New York Law School (1908), then practiced law in Syracuse. A veteran of the Pancho Villa Expedition and World War I, Hancock went on to serve as Syracuse's corporation counsel from 1926 to 1927. A Republican, in 1927 Hancock won a special election for the U.S. House. He was reelected every two years from 1928 to 1944, and served from November 8, 1927, to January 3, 1947.

Hancock did not run for reelection in 1946 because of declining health. He died in Washington, D.C., on January 3, 1948, and was buried at Woodlawn Cemetery in Syracuse.

Early life
Hancock was born in Syracuse, New York, on February 13, 1885, the son of Martha (Connelly) Hancock and Theodore E. Hancock. Theodore Hancock was an attorney and political figure who served as New York Attorney General from 1894 to 1898. Clarence Hancock attended Syracuse's Madison School and graduated from Syracuse Central High School. He then attended Wesleyan University, from which he graduated in 1906, and New York Law School from which he received his LL.B. in 1908. After completing law school, Hancock was admitted to the bar and practiced in Syracuse.

Military service
As a member of the New York National Guard's 1st Cavalry Regiment, Hancock attained the rank of sergeant and served on the Mexican border during the 1916 Pancho Villa Expedition. During World War I, he served in France with the 104th Machine Gun Battalion, a unit of the 27th Division, and attained the rank of captain as commander of the battalion's Company D. He subsequently served as an assistant to the division's judge advocate, J. Leslie Kincaid. The 27th Division commander, John F. O'Ryan, cited Hancock for bravery during combat at Jonc de Mer Ridge, near Le Cateau-Cambrésis, France, on October 18, 1918. During the fighting, Hancock personally conducted front line reconnaissance to determine the best locations to emplace his guns. While under fire throughout the battle, he maintained liaison with the Infantry units his company supported in order to enable their attack. For his heroism, Hancock received the Citation Star. When this award was converted to the Silver Star in 1932, Hancock's decoration was upgraded the new award.

Legal career
Hancock was Syracuse's corporation counsel from 1926 to 1927. In addition, he was a longtime member of Wesleyan University's board of trustees and the board of directors of the Syracuse Journal newspaper. Hancock was a member of the Onondaga County Bar Association, New York State Bar Association, and Syracuse Chamber of Commerce. From 1928 to 1948, Hancock served as a director of Syracuse's Merchants National Bank and Trust Company.

In addition to his legal career, Hancock was also involved in civic and charitable endeavors, including serving as president of the Syracuse Music Festival Association. In addition, he was vice commander of his American Legion post. Hancock was also an athlete, and was a member of the Sedgwick Farm Club (tennis), Cazenovia Club (golf and tennis), Onondaga Golf and Country Club (golf), and Skaneateles Country Club (golf). Hancock was also a member of several social organizations, including Syracuse's University Club and the Century Club of Syracuse.

Member of Congress
In 1927, Hancock was a successful Republican candidate in a special election for the United States House of Representatives. He was reelected nine times, and served from November 8, 1927, to January 3, 1947. As a member of Congress, Hancock opposed President Franklin D. Roosevelt's New Deal. He served on the Judiciary and Naval Affairs Committees and was also chair of the Republican Congressional Campaign Committee's speaker's bureau. In addition, he served as head of the party's eastern speaker's bureau for the 1936 elections.

Death and burial
Hancock did not run for reelection in 1946 because of ill health. He died in Washington, D.C., on January 3, 1948. Hancock was buried at Woodlawn Cemetery in Syracuse.

Family
In 1912, Hancock married Emily W. Shonk (1885-1974) of Plymouth, Pennsylvania. They were the parents of a son, John S. Hancock (1914-2007), a veteran of World War II who pursued a banking career in Syracuse.

Hancock's brother Stewart Freeman Hancock (1883-1966) was a prominent Syracuse area attorney. Hancock's nephew Stewart F. Hancock Jr. was a judge of the New York Court of Appeals.

Legacy
Syracuse Hancock International Airport and the co-located Hancock Field Air National Guard Base are both named in Hancock's honor. After his death, Hancock's family donated his papers to Syracuse University. They were later transferred to the State University of New York at Albany. Hancock's papers, titled Clarence E. Hancock Papers, 1929–1946, are now part of the state university's M.E. Grenander Department of Special Collections.

References

External links
 Clarence Eugene Hancock grave at Woodlawn Cemetery (Syracuse, New York)

The historical atlas of United States Congressional districts, 1789–1983, Kenneth C. Martis et al., New York: Free Press, 1982.

1885 births
1948 deaths
Politicians from Syracuse, New York
People from Washington, D.C.
Wesleyan University alumni
New York Law School alumni
Republican Party members of the United States House of Representatives from New York (state)
20th-century American politicians
Burials at Woodlawn Cemetery (Syracuse, New York)
Lawyers from Syracuse, New York
20th-century American lawyers
United States Army personnel of World War I
Recipients of the Silver Star